Orionella lewisii is a species of beetle in the family Carabidae.

References

Lebiinae
Beetles described in 1873